, born  on 21 February 1976, is a Japanese award-winning actress, model and adult video performer.

Biography

Life and career
Born in Tokyo, after graduating from high school she started working as race queen. Tsugumi made her film debut in Time Leap (1997), a film adaptation of the manga with the same name, then started widely appearing in films, V-Cinema releases, stage plays and TV-dramas. For her role in Moonlight Whispers (1999) she was awarded as Best Newcomer Actress at the 9th Japanese Professional Movie Awards and as Best New Talent at the 21st Yokohama Film Festival.

In 2007, she left her agency and took a break from show business, taking up a job as a company employee.

In 2010 Tsugumi announced her adult video debut with Muteki, a label specialized in casting celebrities in their adult video debut.

Filmography

Selected filmography
 Time Leap (1997), by Imazeki Akemi
 Be-Bop High School (TV, 1997-1998), by Yusuke Narita 
 Moonlight Whispers (1999), by Akihiko Shiota
 Hush! (2001), by Ryōsuke Hashiguchi
 Luxurious Bone (2001), by Isao Yukisada
 New Shadow Warriors (2003), by Sonny Chiba
 Norio's room (2004), by Yoshihiro Fukagawa
 Kono Yo no Sotoe - Club Shinchugun (2004), by Junji Sakamoto
 AKA-SEN (2004), by Junji Sakamoto
 Noriko's Dinner Table (2006), by Sion Sono
 Freesia (2007), by Kazuyoshi Kumakiri
 Sleeping Beauty (2007), by Naoki Yamamoto
 Exte (2007), by Sion Sono

Adult video
 Actress (2010, AV, MUTEKI, Dir.Ryota Nakanishi)
 Clandestine (2011, AV, MUTEKI, Dir.Ryota Nakanishi)

Works

Photo books
 TSUGUMI (1997, III, Tokyo Sensei Inc.) 
 Girl (1997, Bunkasha) 
 Gekisha in Hawaii (1998, Shogakukan) 
 Bone (2001, Asahi Press) 
 Monthly shooting Tsugumi (2004, Shinchosha)

References

External links
 

1976 births
Japanese female adult models
Japanese pornographic film actresses
Japanese film actresses
Japanese gravure models
Japanese stage actresses
Japanese television actresses
Living people
Actresses from Tokyo
20th-century Japanese actresses
21st-century Japanese actresses